The men's 200 metre individual medley SM14 event at the 2020 Paralympic Games took place on 31 August 2021, at the Tokyo Aquatics Centre.

Heats
The swimmers with the top eight times, regardless of heat, advanced to the final.

Final

References

Swimming at the 2020 Summer Paralympics